Jeanne-Julie-Louise Le Brun (née Julie Nigris; 12 February 1780 – 8 December 1819), nicknamed “Brunette”, was the daughter of Élisabeth Vigée Le Brun, and was the model of many of her paintings.

Life 
Julie Le Brun was born on 12 February 1780 in Paris, France, to Jean-Baptiste-Pierre Le Brun and Élisabeth Vigée Le Brun. When her parents separated in 1789, Julie traveled with her mother. Early in life she produced a number of pastels, including one after a piece by Jakob Orth; in her memoirs the elder painter refers to "ses heureuses dispositions pour la peinture".

Relations with her mother were strained from time to time, especially after her marriage to Gaëtan-Bernard Nigris in 1799. The couple soon separated. Le Brun attempted to support herself with her art, appearing in 1811 under the name "Dlle Nigris" in an exhibit in the rue Saint-Lazare. She died at the age of 39 in 1819.

References

External links

1780 births
1819 deaths
French women painters
Painters from Paris
18th-century French painters
18th-century French women artists
19th-century French painters
19th-century French women artists
Julie
Vigée family